Capricorn Energy PLC (previously Cairn Energy PLC) is a British oil and gas exploration and development company and is listed on the London Stock Exchange. Capricorn has discovered and extracted oil and gas in a variety of locations around the world. Capricorn Energy has a primary listing on the London Stock Exchange and is a constituent of the FTSE 250 Index.

History
The company was founded in 1981 by Sir Bill Gammell, the former international Rugby player, his father James (Jimmy), his brother Pete and others, as Cairn Energy.  Its initial operations were in the USA and, following its listing on the London Stock Exchange in 1988, it expanded into the UK North Sea and internationally (Papua New Guinea, Spain, Vietnam, China and Australia). The company acquired Conoco's UK onshore acreage in 1988 and became one of the largest operators of UK onshore oil production with the Palmers Wood oil field just south of London, near Junction 6 of the M25, and at Humbly Grove (near Basingstoke).

The company expansion started with a substantial (non-operated) gas discovery (East Cameron 331) Bangladesh near Chittagong, in 1996. In parallel, the company launched a series of takeovers of public listed companies – Teredo Petroleum in 1994, Holland Sea Search NV in 1995 and Command Petroleum in 1996.

In 1996, the company farmed out a 25% interest in the Sangu field to Halliburton in return for Halliburton bearing a 50% share of the development costs. In 1997, it sold half of all its Bangladeshi interests to Royal Dutch Shell in return for Shell assuming a $330 million carry of the company's exploration and development costs. This agreement gave the company an interest in Shell's huge acreage position in Rajasthan onshore in North West India. The company drilled two unsuccessful exploration wells and Shell then sold its 50% share to the company for $7.5 million: the company's third well, now 100% owned, found the Mangala oil field.

In December 2010, the company agreed to sell a stake of 58.5% of Cairn India, its India-focused subsidiary, to Vedanta Resources for $8.67 billion. Talks between the two companies started in August 2010. However, approval did not come from the Indian government until September 2011 and the deal had to be restructured.

The company sold an additional 3.5 per cent of its shares in its Cairn India for about US$360 million in June 2012. In March 2014, the company announced that Bill Gammell would step down as chairman after the annual general meeting on 15 May 2014.

The company changed its name from Cairn Energy to Capricorn Energy on 13 December 2021.

Operations
The company holds a portfolio of exploration, development and production assets, currently with interests in the following countries; the UK, Israel, Senegal, Côte d'Ivoire, Mexico and Suriname.

Dispute

In 2006-2007, after Cairn UK transferred shares of Cairn India Holdings to its Indian counterpart Cairn India, it refused to pay capital gains tax in India. In response, the Indian government in 2012 made any capital gains resulting for the transfer of shares from a foreign entity whose assets were located in Indian taxable from 1962 retrospectively.

In December 2020, the Permanent court of Arbritration at the Hague, awarded Cairn Energy $1.7bn in costs and damages, and in July 2021, a French court ordered a freeze on Indian Government properties in Paris and gave Cairn Energy the right to seize aircraft belonging to Air India.

References

External links

 Official website

Oil and gas companies of Scotland
Companies based in Edinburgh
Energy companies established in 1981
Non-renewable resource companies established in 1981
1981 establishments in Scotland
Companies listed on the London Stock Exchange
Scottish brands